Rashaad Coward (born November 6, 1994) is an American football offensive tackle for the Arizona Cardinals of the National Football League (NFL). He played college football as a defensive end at Old Dominion. He has played for the Chicago Bears, Pittsburgh Steelers, Jacksonville Jaguars, and Atlanta Falcons.

Professional career

Chicago Bears
Coward signed with the Chicago Bears as an undrafted free agent on May 11, 2017. He was waived on September 2, 2017 and was signed to the practice squad the next day. He was promoted to the active roster on December 9, 2017, and made his regular-season debut in the Week 14 game against the Cincinnati Bengals.

Although Coward was a defensive end during his rookie year, head coach Matt Nagy announced that Coward would be moved to offensive line for the 2018 season. He was an exclusive-rights free agent (ERFA) after the year, but returned to the Bears after being tendered a contract.

In 2019, Coward started ten games at right guard after Kyle Long suffered a season-ending injury. He became an ERFA for the second time at season's end before re-signing on April 17, 2020.

Pittsburgh Steelers
Coward signed a one-year contract with the Pittsburgh Steelers on March 30, 2021. He was released on October 9, 2021.

Jacksonville Jaguars
On October 12, 2021, Coward signed with the Jacksonville Jaguars. On October 21, Coward was released by the Jaguars.

Pittsburgh Steelers (second stint)
On November 23, 2021, Coward was signed to the Pittsburgh Steelers practice squad.

Atlanta Falcons
On January 24, 2022, Coward signed a reserve/future contract with the Atlanta Falcons. On June 2, 2022, he was released by the Falcons.

Arizona Cardinals
On August 2, 2022, Coward signed with the Arizona Cardinals. He was waived on August 30, 2022 and signed to the practice squad the next day. He was placed on the practice squad/injured list on September 14, 2022. He was released on September 19. He was re-signed on November 2. He was promoted to the active roster on November 15.

References

External links
Old Dominion Monarchs bio

1994 births
Living people
Sportspeople from Brooklyn
Players of American football from New York City
American football defensive tackles
American football offensive guards
Old Dominion Monarchs football players
Chicago Bears players
Sheepshead Bay High School alumni
Pittsburgh Steelers players
Jacksonville Jaguars players
Atlanta Falcons players
Arizona Cardinals players